is a passenger railway station located in the city of Akiruno, Tokyo, Japan, operated by East Japan Railway Company (JR East).

Lines 
Musashi-Itsukaichi Station is the terminus of the Itsukaichi Line, and is located 11.1 kilometers from the starting point of the line at Haijima Station.

Station layout 
The station has one island platform serving two elevated bi-directional tracks. The station is staffed, and facilities within the building include a convenience store. The station has north and south exits.

Platform

History
With the privatization of Japanese National Railways (JNR) on 1 April 1987, the station came under the control of JR East.

Passenger statistics
In fiscal 2019, the station was used by an average of 4,164 passengers daily (boarding passengers only).

The passenger figures for previous years are as shown below.

Surrounding area
 Nishi Tokyo Bus Itsukaichi Operations Facility
 Itsukaichi Kaidō (Tokyo Route 7, Suginami-Akiruno Line)
 Itsukaichi High School
 Itsukaichi Junior High School
 Itsukaichi Elementary School
 Akiruno City Itsukaichi Branch Office
 Aki River

See also
 List of railway stations in Japan

References

External links 

  

Stations of East Japan Railway Company
Railway stations in Tokyo
Akiruno, Tokyo
Itsukaichi Line
Railway stations in Japan opened in 1925